A. MohammedJan was an Indian politician and former Member of the Tamil Nadu legislative assembly from Ranipet constituency. He was the Minister for Backward Classes and Minorities Welfare, Govt. of Tamil Nadu. He represented Anna Dravida Munnetra Kazhagam party. He died due to heart attack on March 23, 2021 during an election campaign in Walajah, Tamilnadu.

References 

Members of the Tamil Nadu Legislative Assembly
All India Anna Dravida Munnetra Kazhagam politicians
Indian Muslims
State cabinet ministers of Tamil Nadu
Living people
Year of birth missing (living people)